Evangeline "Evelien" Koogje (born 31 July 1959) is a retired Dutch rower.  Her teams finished in eighth place at the 1975 World Championships in the coxed four and at the 1976 Summer Olympics in the coxed eight events.

References

1959 births
Living people
Dutch female rowers
Olympic rowers of the Netherlands
Rowers at the 1976 Summer Olympics
People from Appingedam
Sportspeople from Groningen (province)